Bikinsky District is an administrative and municipal district (raion), one of the seventeen in Khabarovsk Krai, Russia. It is located in the southwest of the krai. Its administrative center is the town of Bikin (which is not administratively a part of the district). Population:

Administrative and municipal status
Within the framework of administrative divisions, Bikinsky District is one of the seventeen in the krai. The town of Bikin serves as its administrative center, despite being incorporated separately as a town of krai significance—an administrative unit with the status equal to that of the districts.

As a municipal division, the district is incorporated as Bikinsky Municipal District, with the town of krai significance of Bikin being incorporated within it as Bikin Urban Settlement.

References

Notes

Sources

Districts of Khabarovsk Krai
